The IAC Building, IAC's headquarters located at 555 West 18th Street on the northeast corner of Eleventh Avenue in the Chelsea neighborhood of Manhattan, New York City, is a Frank Gehry-designed building that was completed in 2007. The building was Gehry's first in New York and featured the world's largest high definition screen at the time in its lobby.

Reminiscent of several other Gehry designs, the building appears to consist of two major levels: a large base of twisted tower-sections packed together like the cells of a bee hive, with a second bundle of lesser diameter sitting on top of the first. The cell units have the appearance of sails skinned over the skeleton of the building. The full-height windows fade from clear to white on the top and bottom edges of each story. The overall impression is of two very tall stories, which belies its actual 10-story structure. Vanity Fair commented that the building is perhaps one of the world's most attractive office buildings.  Barry Diller, the head of IAC who was intimately involved with the project, mandated that the facade be covered in smooth glass rather than wrinkling titanium, as Gehry had originally planned. Diller said he chose Gehry to design the building because he wanted a space where workers "could collaborate and be in an open atmosphere" which he did not think could be done as easily in a typical boxy building.

In popular culture
The IAC Building is featured in the movies The Other Guys and Wall Street: Money Never Sleeps. It was featured in multiple CollegeHumor sketches, as the building served as the company's New York office.

Gallery

See also
IAC Video Wall

References
Notes

External links

  Official website 

Office buildings in Manhattan
IAC (company)
Frank Gehry buildings
Office buildings completed in 2007
Chelsea, Manhattan
Eleventh Avenue (Manhattan)
West Side Highway
2007 establishments in New York City